Kelloholm is a village in Dumfries and Galloway, Scotland. It has a primary school, a public house and several shops. Kelloholm lies next to  Kirkconnel and the two have begun to merge. Kelloholm was originally constructed to serve the many mines in the area, all of which have now closed.

History
Kelloholm gets its name from the Kello Water and the village began to appear in the early 20th century.

Governance
Kelloholm is part of the Dumfriesshire, Clydesdale and Tweeddale (UK Parliament constituency) and is represented by the Conservative Party MP David Mundell.

Transport
The A76 road runs through the area. Kelloholm is served by bus routes 221 and 246.

The area is served by Kirkconnel railway station on the Glasgow South Western Line.

Notable people
David Wells, astrologer and spiritual medium.

References

Villages in Dumfries and Galloway